Desert Crown (foaled 2 March 2019) is a British Thoroughbred racehorse. After winning his only race as a juvenile in 2021 he took the Dante Stakes on his three-year-old debut and then maintained his unbeaten record by winning the Epsom Derby.

Background
Desert Crown is a bay colt with a white star and white sock on his left hind leg bred in England by the Cambridgeshire-based Strawberry Fields Stud. In October 2020 the yearling was put up for auction at the Tattersalls Sale and was bought for 280,000 guineas by Blandford Bloodstock on behalf of the Dubai businessman Saeed Suhail. He was sent into training with Michael Stoute at Freemason Lodge Stables in Newmarket.

Desert Crown is from the sixth crop of foals sired by Nathaniel who won the King George VI and Queen Elizabeth Stakes in 2011 and the Eclipse Stakes in the following year. His other foals have included Enable, Channel and Lady Bowthorpe. His dam Desert Berry showed modest racing ability in a brief racing career, winning one minor race from three starts, but did better as a broodmare, producing four other winners. As a descendant of the British broodmare Suntime she was distantly related to several major winners including Quiet Fling, Byword and Bethrah.

Racing career

2021: two-year-old season
Desert Crown began his racing career in a maiden race over eight and a half furlongs on soft ground at Nottingham Racecourse on 3 November when he was ridden by Richard Kingscote and started at odds of 11/1 in an eleven-runner field. He raced close behind the leaders before taking the lead inside the last quarter mile and won "readily" by five and a half lengths from Schmilsson despite showing his inexperience ("ran green") in the closing stages.

2022: three-year-old season
For his first run as a three-year-old Desert Crown was stepped up sharply in class for the Group 2 Dante Stakes (a major trial race for the Epsom Derby) over ten and a half furlongs at York Racecourse on 22 May. Before the race Stoute said that the colt was short of full fitness after his training was interrupted by what he described as a "minor hiccup". With Kingscote in the saddle he started the 7/2 joint favourite alongside the Royal Lodge Stakes winner Royal Patronage while the other six runners included the Criterium de Saint-Cloud winner El Bodegon. After racing towards the rear of the field he moved up to take the lead two furlongs from the finish and despite hanging to the right in the closing stages he stayed on well to win by three and a quarter lengths from Royal Patronage. After the race, Stoute, who was winning the race for a record-equaling seventh time commented "I was really impressed with him... He's got further to go at Epsom, but I'd be very hopeful it wouldn't be a problem."

On 4 June Desert Crown started the 5/2 favourite for the 243rd running of the Derby over one and a half miles at Epsom Racecourse. His sixteen opponents included Stone Age (Derrinstown Stud Derby Trial), Nations Pride (Newmarket Stakes), Changingoftheguard (Chester Vase), Piz Badile (Ballysax Stakes), Star of India (Dee Stakes), Westover (Sandown Classic Trial), Royal Patronage, Nahanni (Blue Riband Trial Stakes) and Masekela (Denford Stakes). Kingscote settled the colt in sixth or seventh place as Changingoftheguard set the pace, before moving up on the outside early in the straight and taking the lead approaching the last quarter mile. He quickly opened up a clear lead on his rivals and despite hanging to the left and being eased down in the final strides he won by two and a half lengths from the 150/1 outsider Hoo Ya Mal. After training his sixth Derby winner, Michael Stoute said "We were very hopeful after York that he might win the Derby. But, you know, the performance delighted me because he had won a long way out. He's got such a good mind... I was very happy with where he was positioned when he got to the top of the hill. He's a good athlete and he floated down the hill. It's a wonderful thrill."

Pedigree

Desert Crown is inbred 4x4 to Northern Dancer, meaning that this stallion appears twice in the fourth generation of his pedigree.

References

2019 racehorse births
Racehorses bred in the United Kingdom
Racehorses trained in the United Kingdom
Thoroughbred family 1-p
Epsom Derby winners